The 1993 Marshall Thundering Herd football team represented Marshall University as a member of the Southern Conference (SoCon) during the 1993 NCAA Division I-AA football season. Led by fourth-year head coach Jim Donnan, the Thundering Herd compiled an overall record of 11–4 with a mark of 6–2 in conference play, placing second behind Georgia Southern. Marshall advanced to the NCAA Division I-AA Championship playoffs, where they defeated  in the first round, Delaware in the quarterfinals, and Troy State in the semifinals before falling to Youngstown State in the NCAA Division I-AA Championship Game. Marshall had beaten Youngstown State the year before in the NCAA Division I-AA title game and lost to the Penguins in the 1991 title game. Marshall played home games at Marshall University Stadium in Huntington, West Virginia.

Schedule

References

Marshall
Marshall Thundering Herd football seasons
Marshall Thundering Herd football